Octopus's Garden is a children's book written by English musician Ringo Starr, former member and drummer of the Beatles, and illustrated by Ben Cort. The book is named after and based on the Beatles' 1969 song of the same name, which Starr wrote and sung, from their album Abbey Road.

Publication 
The book was first published on 24 October 2013 in Great Britain by Simon & Schuster UK. It was published in January 2014 in North America. Included with the book are a CD featuring a previously unreleased recording of the song and an audio reading of the story by Starr.

References 

2014 children's books
British children's books
Books about cephalopods
Fictional octopuses
American picture books
Books by Ringo Starr
Works based on songs
The Beatles
Aladdin Paperbacks books